A Sentimental Education is the debut studio album by Idlewild guitarist Rod Jones, self-released in February 2010 and on Borough Music in April 2010. The album was mixed by regular Idlewild producer Dave Eringa.

The limited edition version of the album was available to pre-order on Jones' official website in late 2009 and contained "exclusive artwork, two exclusive bonus tracks, and all participants will have their name in the album."

Track listing
"Sing it Alone"
"Wonderful"
"Taking You to Heart"
"Sing Your Praises"
"Black is the Colour"
"Past Passes By"
"Paint the Sky"
"A Pirate Song"
"Your Deaf Heart"
"No Sound"
"Broken Flowers"
"The Longingness of Time"

Pre-order bonus tracks
"Christmas Fire"
"Rhythm is a Dancer"

Personnel

Musicians
Rod Jones - vocals, guitar, bass, keyboards
Jacqueline Irvine - viola, vocals
Catrin Pryce-Jones - violin
Jack Nicholson - drums, percussion
Josef Sykora - additional keyboards
Amber Wilson - vocals

Recording personnel
Rod Jones - recording, producer
Dave Eringa - mixing
Ed - mastering

Artwork
Kamilla Kowalczyk - photography

References

2010 albums